Hyphessobrycon sweglesi is a species of tetra that lives in the Orinoco River drainage basin in South America. The fish has a round black spot behind the gill-plate, a black band on the dorsal fin that is bordered above and below by creamy-white. The other fins are red same as the upper rim of the eye. The fish eats worms, small insects, and crustaceans. The species can lay up to 400 eggs that can hatch in a day and that are susceptible to fungus. The species' appearance is very similar to Hyphessobrycon megalopterus (black phantom tetra). The species' scientific name used to be Megalamphodus sweglisi and the species' common name is red phantom tetra.

References

External links 
Red Phantom Tetra Fact Sheet 

Characidae
Freshwater fish of Colombia
Tropical fish
Fish described in 1961
Taxa named by Jacques Géry